December Looms is the second solo album by John Mann of Spirit of the West, released in 2007. The album is credited to Mister Mann.

The song "By Tomorrow" includes a songwriting credit for Mann's son Harlan.

The album garnered Mann a Western Canadian Music Award nomination for Songwriter of the Year.

Track listing

 "By Tomorrow"
 "I've Been Bad"
 "I Play Blind"
 "My Little Lamb"
 "The New Normal"
 "Port Town"
 "When I Played Around With Knives"
 "Traveling on the Coat-Tails"
 "Wonderful Sign"
 "Nothing Ever Dropped"
 "Blue"

References

2007 albums
John Mann (musician) albums